Meseli (Mäśäle; , Meselpuś) is a rural locality (a selo) and the administrative centre of Meselinsky Selsoviet, Aurgazinsky District, Bashkortostan, Russia. The population was 592 as of 2010. There are 8  streets.

Geography 
Meseli is located 29 km south of Tolbazy (the district's administrative centre) by road. Maneyevo is the nearest rural locality.

References 

Rural localities in Aurgazinsky District